Frederik Jorgaqi (born 1942) is an Albanian footballer. He played in two matches for the Albania national football team from 1965 to 1967.

References

External links
 

1942 births
Living people
Albanian footballers
Albania international footballers
Place of birth missing (living people)
Association footballers not categorized by position